The 1947 Denver Pioneers football team was an American football team that represented the University of Denver as member of the Mountain States Conference (MSC) during the 1947 college football season. In their seventh and final season under head coach Cac Hubbard, the Pioneers compiled a 5–4–1 record (3–2–1 against conference opponents), finished second in the MSC, and outscored opponents by a total of 153 to 138. The team played its home games at Denver Stadium in Denver.

Schedule

References

Denver
Denver Pioneers football seasons
Denver Pioneers football